Park Soo-jin (born December 4, 1995) is a South Korean singer. She joined Brave Entertainment in 2014 while she was a semi-finalist on the MBC audition program The Great Birth Season 3. She also appeared on Immortal Song: Singing the Legend in 2014 and 2015.

Music career

2014–present: Solo debut
Park Soo-jin officially debuted on March 14, 2014 with her first single "My Story". On December 11, 2014 she came back with her second single "Fallin" with a music video released the same day.

Discography

Extended plays

Singles

Soundtrack appearances

Compilation appearances

References 

Living people
1995 births
South Korean women pop singers
Brave Entertainment artists